Paraeurypterus is a genus of prehistoric eurypterid from the Late Ordovician period. The genus contains one species, P. anatoliensis, known from Şort Tepe in Turkey. Classified as part of the Eurypteroidea superfamily, it has not yet been possible to classify it as part of any particular family.

See also 
 List of eurypterids

References 

Eurypteroidea
Ordovician eurypterids
Ordovician arthropods
Fossil taxa described in 2013
Fossils of Turkey
Eurypterids of Asia